Aruvankattuvalasu is a Hamlet in the Dindigul district of the Indian state Tamil Nadu.

Location
It is situated on the banks of Nallathangi Odai (a very small river), 18 km northeast of the Temple Town Palani and 28 km northwest of Oddanchatram, which has the largest vegetable market in Tamil Nadu. It is a subvillage of Kothayam Panchayat, Oddanchatram Taluk.

People
The village population is roughly 250.

Education
J. R. C Hr Sec School

Temples
The Village has 3 major Temples apart from the Head of all Gods Vinayakar Temple under the Tree called Ichi Maram. The Kaliyamman Temple is in the heart of the Village and the deity is believed to be very Powerful. The Kannimar Temple is situated under a Big Banyan Tree on the bank of Nallathangal river. The Idol is believed to be found on the flood in Nallathangal river.
The Murugan Temple is situated some 500 meters west to the Village and on the main road to Palani.
A small madam (place for the devotees to stay briefly while traveling to Palani Temple from Kodumudi) is also there. Gurukulam (place where students stay with the teacher for education) was functioning in the Murugan Temple until the 1950s. A small temple was built for Murugan in 2006 and Kumbsbisekam was performed.
Usually in earlier days, The Festival was celebrated in summer of every year. But nowadays it happens only once in 3 to 4 years. But a special Pooja is conducted every year. Kavadi festival is celebrated every year by bringing the holy water to

Villages in Dindigul district